"Free Your Body" is a single written and recorded by Belgian acid house musician Praga Khan. It consists of the songs "Free Your Body" and "Injected with a Poison". Subsequent remixes of "Injected with a Poison" incorporated elements of "Free Your Body" and were released as singles.

Track listing
Belgian CD Single
 "Free Your Body" - 5:01	
 "Injected with a Poison" - 5:55	
 "Free Your Body" - 3:31	
 "Injected with a Poison" - 3:40

Belgian/UK/Italian Vinyl Single
 "Free Your Body" - 5:16	
 "Injected with a Poison" - 5:22

French CD Single
 "Free Your Body (Original 7" Mix)" - 3:34	
 "Injected with a Poison (Original 7" Mix)" - 3:42	
 "Free Your Body (Original 12" Mix)" - 5:04	
 "Injected with a Poison (Original 12" Mix)" - 5:58	
 "Free Your Body ... Injected with a Poison (There's a Rainbow Inside My Mind) (UK Remix)" - 5:05	
 "Free Your Body ... Injected with a Poison (We Don't Need That Anymore) (Adams Groove Mix)" - 5:01

German/French 12" Single
 "Free Your Body (Original 12" Mix)" - 5:04	
 "Injected with a Poison (Original 12" Mix)" - 5:54	
 "Injected with a Poison (There's a Rainbow Inside Your Mind) (UK Remix)" - 5:01	
 "Injected with a Poison (We Don't Need That Anymore) (Adams Groove Mix)" - 5:01

US CD Single
 "Free Your Body (Injected With A Poison Mix)	5:55	
 "Free Your Body (Ultra Sonic Dance Mix)" - 5:28	
 "Kick Back for the Rave Alarm" - 5:02	
 "Free Your Body (Original Mix)" - 5:01	
 "Free Your Body (U.K. Rave Mix)" - 5:02	
 "Rave Alarm (Instrumental)" - 5:02	
 "Free Your Body (Injected with a Poison: '92 MNO Remix)" - 5:41

US 12" Single
 "Free Your Body (Ultra Sonic Dance Mix)" - 5:28	
 "Free Your Body (Original Mix)" - 3:30	
 "Kick Back For The Rave Alarm" - 5:02	
 "Free Your Body (UK Rave Mix)" - 5:02	
 "Free Your Body (Injected with a Poison '92 MNO Remix)" - 5:41

Charts

References

1991 singles